Rory Laird (born 29 December 1993) is a professional Australian rules football player who plays for the Adelaide Football Club in the Australian Football League (AFL). He was drafted by Adelaide with pick 5 in the 2011 Rookie Draft.

AFL career
In his first season in the AFL, Laird did not play for Adelaide.

He immediately became a regular in the side, missing only one further game in the season through injury, and averaging 18.5 disposals per game as a small defender. Laird received the Round 20 nomination for the 2013 AFL Rising Star award, following a 24-possession game against , and signed a two-year contract with the club in the same week. Laird played 16 games in 2014 despite injury issues, playing in defence and occasionally in the midfield. He was dropped to the SANFL late in the season but responded with a 42-possession game to earn a recall.

Laird had a breakout year in 2015, playing every game and averaging 24.4 disposals in defence while blanketing his opponents, which earned him a place on the 40-man shortlist for the All-Australian team. During the year, he signed a three-year contract extension with the club. In 2016, he was named in the 40-man All-Australian squad but did not make the team. He improved even more on his form in 2017, starting the season with a 40-possession game against . His form continued to stay at an elite level throughout the season, including a 34-possession game against  in Round 12. His consistency was reward with both All-Australian selection and being nominated by his team for the AFL Players' Association MVP Award.

In 2018, Laird won the Malcolm Blight Medal as the Crows' Best and Fairest player. He was also selected in the All-Australian team for the second season in a row.

In March 2021, Laird signed a five-year contract extension with the Crows.

Personal life
Laird grew up in the suburb of Eden Hills, South Australia. He attended Scotch College, Adelaide, where he was coached by Brownlow Medalist Gavin Wanganeen.

Statistics
 Statistics are correct to end of Round 23 2022

|- style="background:#eaeaea;"
! scope="row" style="text-align:center" | 2013
| style="text-align:center" | 
| 46 || 18 || 1 || 2 || 180 || 153 || 333 || 74 || 51 || 0.1 || 0.1 || 10.0 || 8.5 || 18.5 || 4.1 || 2.8 || 0
|-
! scope="row" style="text-align:center" | 2014
| style="text-align:center" | 
| 29 || 16 || 2 || 2 || 126 || 129 || 255 || 65 || 37 || 0.1 || 0.1 || 7.9 || 8.1 || 15.9 || 4.1 || 2.3 || 0
|- style="background:#eaeaea;"
! scope="row" style="text-align:center" | 2015
| style="text-align:center" | 
| 29 || 23 || 2 || 4 || 289 || 273 || 562 || 133 || 58 || 0.1 || 0.2 || 12.6 || 11.9 || 24.4 || 5.8 || 2.5 || 2
|-
! scope="row" style="text-align:center" | 2016
| style="text-align:center" | 
| 29 || 19 || 1 || 1 || 251 || 270 || 521 || 127 || 40 || 0.1 || 0.1 || 13.2 || 14.2 || 27.4 || 6.7 || 2.1 || 11
|- style="background:#eaeaea;"
! scope="row" style="text-align:center" | 2017
| style="text-align:center" | 
| 29 || 25 || 3 || 1 || 367 || 369 || 736 || 143 || 55 || 0.1 || 0.0 || 14.7 || 14.8 || 29.4 || 5.7 || 2.2 || 9
|-
! scope="row" style="text-align:center" | 2018
| style="text-align:center" | 
| 29 || 20 || 3 || 4 || 319 || 325 || 644 || 124 || 43 || 0.2 || 0.2 || 16.0 || 16.3 || 32.2 || 6.2 || 2.2 || 19
|- style="background:#eaeaea;"
! scope="row" style="text-align:center" | 2019
| style="text-align:center" | 
| 29 || 22 || 0 || 1 || 322 || 301 || 623 || 125 || 47 || 0.0 || 0.0 || 14.6 || 13.7 || 28.3 || 5.7 || 2.1 || 2
|- 
| scope=row | 2020 || 
| 29 || 17 || 3 || 1 || 186 || 203 || 389 || 46 || 70 || 0.2 || 0.1 || 10.9 || 11.9 || 22.9 || 2.7 || 4.1 || 4
|- style="background:#eaeaea;"
! scope="row" style="text-align:center" | 2021
| style="text-align:center" | 
| 29 || 22 || 3 || 8 || 314 || 390 || 704 || 82 || 130 || 0.1 || 0.4 || 14.3 || 17.8 || 32.0 || 3.7 || 5.9 || 16
|-
! scope="row" style="text-align:center" | 2022
| style="text-align:center" | 
| 29 || 20 || 7 || 8 || 284 || 375 || 659 || 53 || 162 || 0.3 || 0.4 || 14.2 || bgcolor=CAE1FF | 18.8† || bgcolor=CAE1FF | 33.0† || 2.6 || 8.1 || 10
|- style="background:#eaeaea;"
|- class="sortbottom"
! colspan=3| Career
! 202
! 25
! 32
! 2638
! 2788
! 5426
! 972
! 693
! 0.1
! 0.1
! 13.0
! 13.8
! 26.8
! 4.8
! 3.4
! 73
|}

Notes

References

External links

Living people
1993 births
Adelaide Football Club players
West Adelaide Football Club players
Australian rules footballers from South Australia
Adelaide Football Club (SANFL) players
All-Australians (AFL)
Australia international rules football team players
Malcolm Blight Medal winners